The 2014–15 season of the OK Liga is the 46th season of top-tier rink hockey in Spain.

FC Barcelona won its twenty-sixth title in their history, winning 28 matches, and losing only one.

Teams

Standings

Top goalscorers

Copa del Rey

The 2015 Copa del Rey was the 72nd edition of the Spanish men's roller hockey cup. It was played at the Pavelló d'Esports de Reus between the eight first qualified teams after the first half of the season.

CP Vic won its 4th cup.

Bracket

Quarter-finals

Semifinals

Final

References

External links
Real Federación Española de Patinaje

OK Liga seasons
2014 in roller hockey
2015 in roller hockey
2014 in Spanish sport
2015 in Spanish sport